Galugah is a city in Mazandaran Province, Iran.

Galugah or Galu Gah or Gelugah may also refer to various places in Iran:

Galugah, Babol, a city in Babol County, Mazandaran Province
Galugah County, an administrative subdivision of Manzandaran Province
Galugah, Fars, a village in Fars Province
Galugah, Kerman, a village in Kerman Province
Galugah, Zahedan, a village in Sistan and Baluchestan Province